Cosi is a 1996 Australian comedy-drama film directed by Mark Joffe. Louis Nowra wrote both the screenplay and the 1992 play it was originally based on.

Plot
Ben Mendelsohn stars as Lewis Riley, an unemployed young man who applies for a job as a director/drama teacher at a mental hospital. He lands the job and finds himself directing a production of the Mozart opera Così fan tutte, an elaborate, demanding piece of theatre, an opera in Italian. And it is going to be performed by a cast that he must select from among the patients, who only speak English.

One of the patients, Roy (Barry Otto), sweeps everything along before him, organising auditions, selecting cast members, and criticising the director. The cast chosen include three women: Julie (Toni Collette), Ruth (Pamela Rabe), and Cherry (Jacki Weaver); and two men: Henry (Paul Chubb) and Doug (David Wenham). The musical director is Zac (Colin Hay). The enthusiasm of Roy infects the group, and they charge headlong into a memorable production.

Alongside the story of Lewis, the theme of Così fan tutte is explored as it relates to his personal life. Lewis's relationship with his girlfriend Lucy (Rachel Griffiths), already under pressure, is not helped by a friend called Nick (Aden Young), who seems more interested in testing Lucy's faithfulness than anything else.

The story is loosely based on Nowra's own experience at producing Trial by Jury at Plenty Mental Hospital in suburban Melbourne in 1971.

Cast
Ben Mendelsohn as Lewis Riley
Barry Otto as Roy
Toni Collette as Julie
Rachel Griffiths as Lucy
Aden Young as Nick
Colin Friels as Errol
Jacki Weaver as Cherry
Pamela Rabe as Ruth
Paul Chubb as Henry
Colin Hay as Zac
David Wenham as Doug

(Mendelsohn, Otto and Wenham are the only cast members who have performed in the original stage play, portraying the same characters that they do on screen.)

Production
Cosi was directed by Mark Joffe and produced by Richard Brennan and Timothy White. The film underwent pre-production in November 1994-January 1995. Shooting took place between January and March 1995, followed by post-production between March and September 1995. The film had a budget of $3.5 million and was filmed in and around Sydney's Rozelle Hospital.

Bruno Lawrence was originally cast in the role of Errol, the security guard, but during shooting he was taken to the hospital suffering from chest pains and was diagnosed with inoperable lung cancer. Colin Friels took over the role of Errol. Lawrence died a few months later, on 10 June 1995. The closing credits of Cosi include an onscreen dedication to Lawrence.

Critical reception 
In 1996, Cosi was the 3rd most popular Australian film at the Australian Box Office. As at 2010, Cosi ranked 71 on the list of Top 100 Australian feature films of all time as compiled by Screen Australia.

David Stratton, writing in Variety, described Cosi as "fast, funny and cleverly acted". He also said it was "warm, generous, sentimental and expert entertainment." The curator at Australian Screen Online said it "has a likeable humour, appealing characters and a compassionate heart. It's not really about mental illness so much as a tribute to the healing power of performance, and the theatre in general."

Not all reviews were positive. James Berardinelli described Cosi as "a half-baked amalgamation of A Midwinter's Tale and Shine, and doesn't excel as either a comedy or a drama." Cinephilia described Cosi as "a concatenation of caricatures in a predictable story of plucky determination and treacly redemption."

Accolades

Box office
Cosi grossed $2,896,980 at the box office in Australia.

Although Cosi was the first Australian film to receive major pre-production investment by Miramax, it did not fare well critically or commercially in America, screening for less than two weeks between 11 and 24 April 1997.

See also

 List of Australian films
 List of films shot in Sydney

References

Further reading
 Gillard, Garry (2001) H231 Australian Cinema: Unit Information and Study Guide. Perth, Murdoch University Press, p. 65.
 Malone, P. "Cosi" – Review in Cinema Papers, No. 109, April 1996, p. 41.
 O'Dometer, M. Cosi – review, 1996
 O'Regan, T. (1996) Australian National Cinema, New York/London, Routledge.
 Smith, M. "Running the Gamut" in Cinema Papers, No. 109, April 1996, p. 6.

External links
 
Cosi at Oz Movies
 Australian Screen, Cosi
 Paper by Joanne Ladiges

Films set in Australia
Australian comedy films
Films shot in Sydney
1996 films
Films directed by Mark Joffe
Australian films based on plays
Wolfgang Amadeus Mozart in fiction
Miramax films
Films based on Così fan tutte
1990s English-language films